Phil Pritchard may refer to:

 Phil Pritchard (ice hockey), curator of the Hockey Hall of Fame 
 Phil Pritchard (footballer) (born 1965), English footballer